FC Almaz Moscow was a Russian football team from Moscow. It played professionally in the Russian Second Division zone West in 2004. It was excluded from the league after playing 18 games for financial reasons.

External links
  Team history by footballfacts

Association football clubs established in 1972
Association football clubs disestablished in 2004
Defunct football clubs in Moscow
1972 establishments in the Soviet Union
2004 disestablishments in Russia